
Restaurant Der Bloasbalg was a restaurant in Wahlwiller, in the Netherlands. It was a fine dining restaurant that was awarded one Michelin star in 1985 and retained that rating until 2005.

From the beginning till 2005, when he sold the restaurant, Jan Waghemans was the head chef.

Der Bloasbalg was a member of the Alliance Gastronomique Néerlandaise.

The restaurant closed down in 2006 and was replaced by restaurant "Les Arômes".

History
In 1966, Jan and Ellie Waghemans started Camping Valencia. Part of the camping was a small canteen, where they sold snacks and drinks to their guests. In 1976, they closed the camping and started a small restaurant. The beginning was difficult, but with Jan Waghemans growing experience (originally he was a housepainter), the food quality and the number of guests was also growing. They were awarded a Michelin star in 1985.

See also
List of Michelin starred restaurants in the Netherlands

References 

Restaurants in the Netherlands
Michelin Guide starred restaurants in the Netherlands
Defunct restaurants in the Netherlands
Der Bloasbalg
Der Bloasbalg